Francis Gregory Stafford (February 9, 1948 – October 10, 2018), usually known as Greg Stafford, was an American game designer, publisher, and practitioner of shamanism.

Stafford is most famous as the creator of the fantasy world of Glorantha, but he was also a prolific games designer. He was designer of Pendragon, he was co-designer of the RuneQuest, Ghostbusters, Prince Valiant and HeroQuest role-playing systems, founder of the role-playing game companies Chaosium and Issaries, designer of the White Bear and Red Moon, Nomad Gods, King Arthur's Knights and Elric board games, and co-designer of the King of Dragon Pass computer game.

Gaming industry career

1970s: Chaosium 
Greg Stafford began wargaming after picking up a copy of U-Boat by Avalon Hill, and in 1966 as a freshman at Beloit College he started writing about the fantasy world of Glorantha. After rejection from a publisher, Stafford created White Bear and Red Moon set in Glorantha, and after three different companies were unable to publish the game he created Chaosium. He derived the name partly from his home, which was near the Oakland Coliseum, and combining "coliseum" with "chaos."

White Bear and Red Moon (1975) was Chaosium's first published game, and was also Stafford's first professional game. Stafford designed the board game Nomad Gods. Stafford also designed the wargames Elric (1977) and King Arthur's Knights (1978).

Stafford wanted the world of Glorantha to be part of an original role-playing game; this ultimately resulted in Steve Perrin's RuneQuest (1978), which was set in Glorantha.

Stafford and Lynn Willis simplified the RuneQuest rules into the 16-page Basic Role-Playing (1980). He designed the miniatures game Merlin. Stafford considers his Arthurian chivalric role-playing game King Arthur Pendragon (1985) his masterpiece. He co-designed the Ghostbusters role-playing game (1986).

Stafford designed the Prince Valiant roleplaying game (1989), which featured a strong storytelling basis and other innovations. Stafford decided to produce a fiction line for Call of Cthulhu after he realized that many Lovecraft fans of the early 1990s had never actually read Lovecraft's fiction but were only familiar with him through Call of Cthulhu. Stafford co-designed the computer game King of Dragon Pass (1999).

1998–2000s: Issaries 
Stafford left Chaosium in 1998, taking all of the rights for Glorantha, and founded the game company Issaries.

Stafford approached Robin Laws to create a new game based on Glorantha, which became known as Hero Wars, published in 2000 as the first fully professional product for Issaries. Stafford published the second edition in 2003 under the name he always wanted HeroQuest, as Milton Bradley's trademark on the name had lapsed. Stafford moved to Mexico in 2004, bringing production from Issaries to an end.

Later years

When Hasbro let the RuneQuest trademark lapse, Stafford picked up the rights to the game and licensed Mongoose Publishing to publish a new edition in 2006. After White Wolf acquired the rights to Pendragon,  it was republished in 2005 by White Wolf. Their ArtHaus imprint published The Great Pendragon Campaign (2006), in which Stafford detailed the massive RPG campaign from the years 485 to 566. After Nocturnal Games picked up the rights to Pendragon, Stafford created a 5.1 edition of Pendragon (2010).

He moved from Berkeley, California to Arcata, California in 2007, having lived in the San Francisco Bay Area for some years.

In June 2015, Stafford and Sandy Petersen returned to Chaosium Inc., with Stafford taking the positions of President and CEO.

Stafford died at his home in Arcata on October 10, 2018 at the age of 70.

Glorantha

Greg Stafford's interest in roleplaying and gaming originated in his adolescent fascination with mythology. During his adolescent years he read anything he could find on the subject, and when he exhausted the libraries, he started to write his own stories in his freshman year at Beloit College, in 1966. This was the start of the world of Glorantha.

Stafford's 1974 board game White Bear and Red Moon had featured the violent struggle between several cultures in the Dragon Pass region of Glorantha. The heart of the game was a conflict between the barbarian Kingdom of Sartar and the invading Lunar Empire, a theme which has remained central to Gloranthan publications since then.

As Stafford was founding his company Chaosium, the game Dungeons & Dragons (and the concept of tabletop role-playing games) was gaining great popularity. Role-players were keen to use the White Bear and Red Moon setting in such games. So Chaosium published RuneQuest, written by "Steve Perrin, Ray Turney, and Friends". Stafford left Chaosium in 1998.

For some years, Stafford slowly wrote several novels set in Glorantha. Novels that he is known to have been working on are Harmast's Saga, Arkat's Saga, and his "Lunar novel".

He was one of the designers on the Glorantha-based video game King of Dragon Pass.

Shamanism-related works

Stafford was a practicing shaman and member of the board of directors of Shaman's Drum, a journal of experiential shamanism. He had some short articles of Arthurian interest published. Stafford lived in Mexico for 18 months, tutoring English as a foreign language, and exploring places of archeological and shamanic interest.

Honors and reception
Fantasy author David A. Hargrave pays homage to Stafford in the Arduin series of supplements, the most widely known example of this being the Stafford's Star Bridge 9th-Level mage spell (Arduin I, page 41).

Stafford was inducted in the Origins Award hall of fame in 1987.

In 1999 Pyramid magazine named Greg Stafford one of The Millennium's Most Influential Persons, "at least in the realm of adventure gaming."

Stafford won the Diana Jones Award in 2007, for The Great Pendragon Campaign, published by White Wolf and in 2015 for  Guide to Glorantha, coauthored with Jeff Richard and Sandy Petersen and published by Moon Design Publications

He was honored as a "famous game designer" by being featured as the king of hearts in Flying Buffalo's 2011 Famous Game Designers Playing Card Deck.

References

External links
 The Stafford Codex – Stafford's personal website.
 Glorantha – Leading site on Stafford's universe Glorantha games.
 Chaosium – Company he founded and current publisher of his games.

1948 births
2018 deaths
Shamans
American animists
Beloit College alumni
Chaosium game designers
People from Arcata, California
Artists from Berkeley, California
Artists from Hartford, Connecticut